Soukhyam is a 2015 Indian Telugu-language romantic action comedy film produced by V. Anand Prasad on Bhavya Creations banner and directed by A.S. Ravi Kumar Chowdary. The film stars Gopichand and Regina Cassandra  and also features Mukesh Rishi, Pradeep Rawat, Devan and Brahmanandam in the supporting roles. the  music composed by Anup Rubens. Kona Venkat and Gopimohan provided the screenplay, written by Sridhar Sepanna. Prasad Murella is the cinematographer, Gautham Raju is the editor and the film was released on 24 December 2015 on Christmas Eve. The film was a disaster at the box office.

Plot
Srinivas (Gopichand) is a happy-go-lucky guy who has a happy family. He falls in love with a beautiful girl named Sailaja (Regina Cassandra) on a train journey from Hyderabad to Tirupati and woos her. By the time Shailu agrees to Seenu's proposal, however, the obstacle in the story comes in the form of her father PR (Devan), who is an influential political broker in Kolkata and Bengal and who wants his daughter to marry the Chief Minister's son. Because of this, he kidnaps his daughter. The second issue is that Seenu's father Krishna Rao (Mukesh Rishi) is a modest man who wants to stay away from influential and violent people, so he asks his son to stay away from this mess and move on with his life. On the other hand, unknowingly, Seenu promises Bavuji (Pradeep Rawat), a local goon, to rescue a girl whom he wants his son, Arjun (Ambati Arjun) to marry because Bavuji has saved his father from an accident. Shockingly, Shailu turns out to be that girl, and now Seenu has to save Shailu from the clutches of Bavuji and PR and also ensure that she is not forcibly married to anyone. After some routine fights with goons, Seenu gets his girlfriend Shailu and lives happily after.

Cast

Gopichand as Srinivas Rao ("Seenu")
Regina Cassandra as Sailaja (Shailu)
Mukesh Rishi as Krishna Rao, Seenu's father
Pradeep Rawat as Bavuji
Devan as PR, Shailu's father
Bramhanandam as Daya
Jaya Prakash Reddy as Pellikoduku
Posani Krishna Murali as Tirupathi Train Passenger
Prudhviraj as Shivudu 
Raghu Babu as Deva, Seenu's uncle
Satya Krishnan as Deva's wife  
Satyam Rajesh as Dr. Sidhappa
Sowcar Janaki as Modern Bamma
Pragathi as Sujatha, Seenu's mother 
Naramalli Sivaprasad as Perfume Prasad 
Saptagiri as Giri 
Krishna Bhagawan 
Sivaji Raja as Seenu's brother-in-law 
Surekha Vani as Seenu's sister 
Gundu Sudarshan as Train Passenger
Raghu Karumanchi as Bavuji's henchman
Ambati Arjun as Arjun, Bavuji's son
Chanti as Constable
C. V. Subbareddy
Sarika Ramachandra Rao 
Ramachandra
Tarzan Laxminarayana
Rajitha
Apoorva
Jyothi

Soundtrack

The music was composed by Anup Rubens and was released on Zee Music Company.

References

External links

2015 films
2010s Telugu-language films
Films scored by Anoop Rubens
2010s masala films
Indian romantic comedy films
Films with screenplays by Kona Venkat
Films shot in Switzerland
Films shot in Hyderabad, India
2015 romantic comedy films